Ji Hujur is a Bangladeshi Bengali-language Drama film. It is directed by Zakir Hossain Raju. It stars Symon Sadik, Sara Zerin, Jemi, Anan, Kazi Hayat, Abbas Ullah Shikder, Nasrin, and Anamika. This film was the debut film of Symon Sadik and Sara Zerin.

Plot
Its story is about a simple and pious young and religious person named Abdur Rahman (Symon Sadik) who comes to Dhaka to a relative's home for  a job. Here he meets with a cunning girl named Bunty (Sara Zerin). The story falls into a twist as Bunty begins to love Abdur Rahman and he starts to chase a team of gangsters.

Cast

Music

References

2012 films
2012 drama films
Bengali-language Bangladeshi films
Films about Islam
Bangladeshi drama films
Films scored by Ali Akram Shuvo
2010s Bengali-language films